The Akhmadov brothers were Chechen generals who took part in the war in Chechnya.

The Akhmadov brothers (Uvais, Ruslan, Rizvan, Apti, Abu, Ramzan, Imran, Tagir and Zelimkhan) controlled their home city of Urus-Martan during the late 1990s. Law enforcement bodies had asserted that all the nine brothers took an active part in combat operations against federal forces in Chechnya.

Akhmadov Brothers  

The Akhmadov family was from teip Gendargenoy. Khuta and Abu Akhmadov died in 1999. Apti and Ramzan died in 2000 and 2001 respectively whilst, most recently Rizvan and Zelimkhan died in 2002.

References

Chechen people
Chechen warlords
People of the Chechen wars
Gendargenoy